Longcao Road is an interchange station between Lines 3 and 12 of the Shanghai Metro.

Station Layout

Gallery

References

Railway stations in Shanghai
Shanghai Metro stations in Xuhui District
Line 3, Shanghai Metro
Line 12, Shanghai Metro
Railway stations in China opened in 2000